Jack D. Elliot is an American record producer and songwriter, perhaps best known for works with artist like Britney Spears, 'N Sync, Backstreet Boys, Brandy, and Christina Milian.

Career
In the time that Jack has been on the scene, he has packed his discography with names like Britney Spears, Taylor Dayne, Nick Lachey, 'N Sync, Lo Fidelity Allstars, Backstreet Boys, Brandy, Jade Anderson, and Christina Milian; as well as shows like Access Hollywood, E! News Live, Good Morning America, The View, and the Daytime Emmy Awards.  Constantly working to expand his impressive resume, Jack has had an incredible year.  From a new publishing deal with Kobalt Music, to Billboard chart-topping singles and remixes, the stars just keep on shining.

Not one to be limited, Jack is crossing all of the boundaries in the music and entertainment industries from pop music to television shows to ad campaigns. Currently holding down the #1 slot on Billboard Dance radio chart, Jack's remix of Nick Lachey’s "What's Left of Me" has taken radio by storm.  Two amazing rock/pop songs written and produced by Jack for Taylor Dayne’s comeback album are wrapping up, and new tracks co-written with Shelly Peiken for Warner Bros. Records artist Ashley Tisdale, of High School Musical fame, are underway. Weekly, you can hear Jack’s hot tracks on Fox’s runaway hit “So You Think You Can Dance”, CBS staple Navy NCIS, UPN's wildly popular America's Next Top Model, and MTV's Punk'd and Jamie Kennedy's Blowin' Up. Dr. Pepper also came calling, as Jack's inventive production mash-up is the backdrop for their new ad campaign. Packed dance floors everywhere are thanking Jack as well for writing "I Will Stand", the smash comeback single for disco legend Claudja Berry that is rapidly climbing the Billboard Club charts.

In a relatively short span of time, Jack has been privileged to work with some of music's top talents and legends. Jack had the high honor of collaborating with 14-time Grammy Award winner David Foster, writing and producing "I Want to Be A Millionaire" for ABC’s mega-hit Who Wants to Be a Millionaire?.  The song, featuring his wife Jemma K. Cooper on vocals along with spoken interludes from host Regis Philbin, was the theme for ABC’s national ad campaign for the show. In 2004, Jack had the #2 Billboard dance single of the year for recording artist Reina, with the anthem "If I Close My Eyes".  In 2005, Jack repeated the magic with another #2 Billboard smash "I’ll Be Your Light" for world-renowned diva Kristine W. Co-written with John DeNicola of Dirty Dancing fame, "I'll Be Your Light" became Kristine's theme song as she burst back into the music world after a long fight with leukemia.  Taking his sound worldwide, Jack was also honored to work with Eurovision winner Sertab Erener of Turkey. His song "It Takes More" was featured on Sertab's eagerly awaited first English language album.  Also not to be forgotten are Jack's much loved remixes for pop legends Britney Spears ("...Baby One More Time", "Lucky", "Stronger", "Oops!... I Did It Again"), Backstreet Boys ("The One", "Larger than Life", "I Want It That Way"), 'N Sync ("It's Gonna Be Me"), and Christina Milian ("Whatever You Want").

Remixography

 Ashley Tisdale - "Be Good to Me"
 Ashley Tisdale - "He Said She Said"
 Ashley Tisdale - "So Much for You"
 Nick Lachey - "What's Left of Me"
 Christina Milian - "Whatever You Want"
 Britney Spears - "Stronger"
 Britney Spears - "Lucky"
 Britney Spears - "Oops!... I Did It Again"
 Britney Spears - "...Baby One More Time"
 'N Sync - "It's Gonna Be Me"
 Backstreet Boys - "The One"
 Backstreet Boys - "Larger than Life"
 Backstreet Boys - "I Want It That Way"

 Lucas Prata - "And She Said"
 Lo Fidelity Allstars - "Blisters On My Brain"
 Wild Orchid - "Just Another Girl"
 Angela Via - "Picture Perfect"
 Willa Ford - "Somebody Take the Pain Away"
 Solid HarmoniE - "I'll Be There For You"
 Stevie Wonder - "Look Around"
 Tiffany Affair - "Over It"
 Dolly Parton - "Two Doors Down"
 Kristine W. - "I'll Be Your Light"
 Brian Kent - "Breathe Life"

References

Living people
1971 births
Songwriters from New York (state)
American house musicians
Remixers
Club DJs
People from New Hyde Park, New York